Powerhouse is a British production duo of Hamilton Dean and Julian Slatter who reached #38 in the UK with "Rhythm of the Night" in December 1997.

References

British musical duos
Musical groups established in 1997
Musical groups disestablished in 1997